The 1992–93 Ukrainian Second League was the second season of 3rd level professional football in Ukraine. The League was reorganized into a single group for the next several seasons. The season started on August 17, 1992, and finished on July 3, 1993.

Teams
Due to competition reorganization there were no teams promoted from a lower tier. The Second League was created by combining 10 less fortunate teams that previously played in the First League with 8 better teams that previously played in the Transition League. The other 10 less fortunate teams of the last season Transition League were moved to the newly established lower tier also named Transition League where they will compete with better amateur teams.

Promoted teams
None

Relegated teams
Debut for all teams previously playing in the First League

 Azovets Mariupol
 Vahonobudivnyk Stakhanov
 Halychyna Drohobych
 Dnipro Cherkasy
 SKA Kiev
 Krystal Kherson
 Polissya Zhytomyr
 Chaika Sevastopol
 Chornomorets-2 Odessa
 Shakhtar-2 Donetsk

Renamed Teams 
 In August 1992 SKA Kiev changed its name to ZS-Oriyana Kyiv, ZS is an acronym for Armed Forces (Zbroini Syly).
 Soon after the start of the season on September 8, 1992 Polissya changed its name to Khimik Zhytomyr coming under the sponsorship of the local chemical plant.
During the winter break Krystal changed its name to Tavriya Kherson.
During the winter break Shakhtar-2 changed its name to Metalurh Kostyantynivka as the team was stationed in Kostyantynivka since 1992.
On May 21, 1993 ZS-Oriyana changed its name to more common and recognizable CSK ZSU Kyiv (Central Sports Club of the Armed Forces of Ukraine).

Location map

Stadiums

Managers

Standings

Top goalscorers

See also
 Ukrainian First League 1992-93
 Ukrainian Third League 1992-93
 1992-93 Ukrainian Cup

References

External links
 1992-93 Ukrainian Transitional League (Aleksei Kobyzev, Russian)
 1992-93 Ukrainian Transitional League (Footballfacts.ru, Russian)

Ukrainian Second League seasons
3
Ukra